Thalassogeneridae is a family of nematodes belonging to the order Enoplida.

References

Nematodes